MVFC may refer to:
Malden Vale F.C.
Melbourne Victory FC
Missouri Valley Football Conference
Moonee Valley Football Club